Eliza Walker Dunbar (4 November 1845 – 25 August 1925) was a Scottish physician and the first woman from the UK to qualify and work as a doctor.

Early life and education
Eliza Louisa Walker was born in Bolarum, Hyderabad, in 1845. Her father, Alexander Walker, was a doctor from Aberdeenshire who worked for the Bombay Military Department. Her younger brother, Archibald Dunbar Walker, also trained in the medical profession. Educated at Cheltenham Ladies' College, she was fluent in German, and had a keen interest in medicine. As she was unable to enrol in any British medical schools, she instead received training and tuition from St. Mary's Dispensary for Women under Elizabeth Garrett. She joined the Society of Apothecaries when it revised its regulations to include those who did not attend medical schools.

Walker travelled to Switzerland and was one of the "Zurich 7" who were the first women to gain a medical degree from the University of Zurich. After studying there for four years, she submitted her thesis on blockages of the arteries of the brain (Ueber Verstopfung der Hirnarterien), receiving an MD with distinction in 1872. While at the university, she became the first woman assistant in the Zurich canton hospital's women's ward. She carried on to do a year's postgraduate study in Vienna, before returning to England in 1873. It was around this time that she assumed the name of Dunbar.

Career
On her return to England in 1873, Walker applied for the position of house surgeon at Bristol Royal Hospital for Sick Children. She was the only female candidate, and the incumbent medical staff informed the hospital's managing committee that they would resign if she were appointed. When she did get the job, two staff immediately left. Five weeks later, a disagreement between Walker and another staff member led to the remainder of the doctors, all male, walking out. Walker remained in post for five days, the only medical practitioner on site, before resigning to save the hospital further embarrassment.

Instead, she set up a private practice in Clifton, Bristol, before establishing the Read Dispensary for Women and Children in Hotwells, Bristol in 1876. The King and Queen's College of Physicians decided to allow women who already had foreign degrees to register from 1877. Dunbar registered on 10 January 1877. She managed to add her name to the medical register via this Irish route.

Walker held a number of roles in subsequent years, including medical officer for educational facilities, then in 1895, she established the Bristol Private Hospital for Women and Children. Originally the private hospital had space for 12 patients, and focused on the treatment of women by women. In 1906 she published an article in the Bristol Medico-Chirurgical Journal on "The new theory and prophylactic treatment of puerperal eclampsia."

She continued her work until her death following a fall at her home in Bristol on 25 August 1925.

References

1845 births
1925 deaths
Scottish women medical doctors
19th-century Scottish medical doctors
Medical doctors from Mumbai
19th-century women scientists
University of Zurich alumni
20th-century Scottish medical doctors
20th-century women scientists
People from Clifton, Bristol
20th-century women physicians
19th-century women physicians
20th-century Scottish women